German singer Xavier Naidoo began his music career in the early 1990s. His debut studio album, Seeing Is Believing, was released in 1994, consisting mostly of cover versions of traditional tracks and soul songs from the 1960s and 1970s. Released in the United States only, it failed to chart on the Billboard 200 and thus, was never released in Europe. Following a fall-out with main producer Nicole Dürr, he signed with Frankfurt am Main-based Pelham Power Productions (3P) and began appearing as a background vocalist on several of his label-mates' albums. Naidoo's second studio album Nicht von dieser Welt, produced unter the guidance of Moses Pelham and Martin Haas, was released in May 1998. The album peaked at number one on the German Albums Chart and sold more than a million copies. Its singles included his debut single "20.000 Meilen", the top twenty entries "Nicht von dieser Welt" and "Seine Straßen" as well as top five hit "Sie sieht mich nicht", which served as the theme song for the feature film Asterix & Obelix Take On Caesar (1999). A gold-certified live album of his first concert tour, simply titled Live (1999), reached the top ten in Germany the following year.

His third effort, the double album Zwischenspiel – Alles für den Herrn, was released on his own label Naidoo Records in March 2002 after his departure from 3P. An instant success, it debuted atop the charts in both Austria and Germany and was certified double platinum by the Bundesverband Musikindustrie (BVMI). Three of its four singles, including "Wo willst du hin?" and "Abschied nehmen", became top five hits on the singles charts. In 2003, he collaborated with American rapper RZA on his compilation album The World According to RZA; their single "Ich kenne nichts (das so schön ist wie du)" reached number-one on the German Singles Chart and the top three in Austria and Switzerland, becoming his highest-charting single up to that point. The same year, his second live album ...Alles Gute vor uns... was released to gold status and top ten success.

Naidoo's fourth album Telegramm für X was released in November 2005. It reached number-one in Austria, Germany, and Switzerland was certified quadruple platinum by the BVMI. The album produced the top three singles "Dieser Weg" and "Was wir alleine nicht schaffen", while his second number-one hit "Danke", a song about the 2006 FIFA World Cup, was included on a reissue of the album. Alles kann besser werden, his fifth studio album, was released in 2009. It became his fifth number-one album in Germany, and reached the three in Austria and Switzerland. "Alles kann besser werden", its lead single, reached number six on the German Singles Chart though subsequent singles were less successful.

Gespaltene Persönlichkeit, a collaboration album with rapper Kool Savas, was released in 2012. It debuted at number atop the charts in Germany and Switzerland and was certified platinum by the BVMI. Single "Schau nicht mehr zurück" entered the top three in both countries. The same year, Naidoo's first compilation album Danke fürs Zuhören – Liedersammlung 1998–2012 was released to number-one success throughout German-speaking Europe. Mordsmusik, a dubstep album produced under his pseudonym Der Xer, and Bei meiner Seele were both released the following year. The latter album peaked at number one in Austria and Germany and featured the same-titled top two hit.

A highly demanded producer, songwriter and guest vocalist, Naidoo has collaborated with several musicians and musical projects, including all-male vocal group Söhne Mannheims, the Christian music project Zeichen der Zeit, the transnational anti-racism project Brothers Keepers, and the cast of the television series Sing meinen Song – Das Tauschkonzert, the German version of The Best Singers series. Among his most successful appearances rank Brothers Keepers's "Adriano (Letzte Warnung)".

Albums

Studio albums

Collaborative albums as Xavas
(Xavas being Xavier Naidoo and Kool Savas)

Live albums

Singles

As lead artist

Other charted songs

As a featured artist

Other appearances

Album

Soundtrack

References

External links
 XavierNaidoo.com — Official website

Discographies of German artists
Pop music discographies
Rhythm and blues discographies